The 1927 Purdue Boilermakers football team was an American football team that represented Purdue University during the 1927 Big Ten Conference football season. In their sixth season under head coach James Phelan, the Boilermakers compiled a 6–2 record, finished in fifth place in the Big Ten Conference with a 2–2 record against conference opponents, and outscored opponents by a total of 170 to 38. Chester "Cotton" Wilcox was the team captain.

Schedule

References

Purdue
Purdue Boilermakers football seasons
Purdue Boilermakers football